On Approval is a 1964 Australian television play based on the play by Frederick Lonsdale. It was adapted by Noel Robinson.

Plot
At Helen's Mayfair Home, Maria suggests to her suitor Richard that they live together in Scotland for one month. Helen and Richard's friend the Duke of Bristol decide to come along too.

Cast
Felicity Young as Helen
Joan Harris as Maria
Michael Duffield as Richard
George Whaley as Duke of Bristol

References

External links
On Approval at IMDb

1960s Australian television plays
1964 television plays